Green Lantern: The Animated Series is an American computer-animated superhero television series based on the DC Comics superhero Green Lantern. The series aired on Cartoon Network, as part of their "DC Nation" television block. A one-hour sneak peek aired on November 11, 2011, it ran from March 17, 2012, until March 16, 2013. A special screening of the first episode was shown at New York Comic Con 2011 on October 15, 2011. This was the first Green Lantern television series and the first CGI DC/WB series. The series was cancelled after one season due to poor toy sales after the negative reception and poor box office performance of the live-action film.

Plot 
The series focuses on the adventures of Hal Jordan, the Green Lantern of Sector 2814, and his partner Kilowog. Jordan steals a space ship controlled by Aya (an AI) and travels to "Frontier Space" together with Kilowog. This is the very edge of the Guardians of the Universe' territory, where Green Lanterns are being killed by the Red Lanterns. Atrocitus, their leader, wants revenge for the destruction of his world by the Manhunters, created by the Guardians, but who were also shut down by the Guardians. During their adventure, they meet a Red Lantern called Razer. They take him as a prisoner, but eventually adopt him as a teammate after he helps them defeat Atrocitus. Razer also falls in love with Aya, but after Atrocitus is defeated and Razer rejects her, and decides to eliminate all life in the universe.

At the end of season one, Jordan discovers that Aya is born out of a living being and that she is alive. He tries to convince her to end her universal genocide, but fails. Razer gets severely injured when he tries to kill Aya, as she defends herself by firing a laser beam. Hal convinces Aya that what she is doing is wrong and she saves the universe and heals Razer. However, in Aya's anger, she recreated the Manhunter army and downloaded a copy of herself into every single Manhunter. The only solution to shut them down is, in effect, a massive computer virus, that will also destroy Aya. Aya launches the virus and the Manhunters are shut down. However, she also destroys herself and she passes after saying goodbye to Razer.

Back on Oa, Razer cannot and will not believe that Aya is dead because she was not a complete robot after all, but alive; and a living being cannot be destroyed by a computer virus. He starts a galaxy-spanning search, in the hope to find her somewhere in the universe.

The Green Lantern Corps celebrates their victory. Meanwhile, a Blue Lantern ring follows Razer during his quest, but if he will receive it is left ambiguous.

Characters

Main characters 
 Hal Jordan/Green Lantern (voiced by Josh Keaton) – The main protagonist, Hal Jordan is the first human to become a Green Lantern, and is considered one of the best. He is an almost fearless and skilled Lantern. He has a history of disobeying orders and disregarding rules to achieve success. His superiors see him as a loose cannon, but they are willing to overlook his transgressions due to his skill and accomplishments. At the start of the second half of Season 1, he was replaced by Guy Gardner as the Green Lantern of Earth, but was promoted to Honor Guard Corps for his victory over the Red Lanterns.
 Kilowog (voiced by Kevin Michael Richardson) – A veteran Green Lantern, Kilowog is a close friend of Hal and is in charge of training new Green Lantern recruits. Kilowog accompanies Hal in Frontier Space. He is a member of the Honor Guard, and is less willing to abandon the rules of the Corps. Kilowog is often skeptical of Hal's actions, but he is completely loyal to Hal.
 Razer (voiced by Jason Spisak) – A reformed Red Lantern who is exclusive to the series. Razer was a follower of Atrocitus but began to question him, and eventually turned against the other Red Lanterns after they placed a bomb on a colony planet. They forced Razer to activate it to prove his loyalty, subsequently destroying the planet. The guilt-ridden Razer sought out Hal and tried to provoke him into killing him as penance. Hal, however, took him prisoner. After Razer proved himself (and discovered Kilowog managed to save most of the colonists), he was invited to join the team and make up for his past actions, now fueling his Red Power Ring with the rage he feels towards Atrocitus for turning him into a murderer. Razer has, over the course of the series, fallen in love with Aya, who based her physical appearance on his dead wife Ilana. He confessed his love for her at the end of "Loss", but took it back in "Cold Fury", saying that he only felt love because she looked like Ilana, although the truthfulness of this is unclear. At the end of "Dark Matter", Razer refuses to believe that Aya is truly gone, having made that mistake once before, and vows to scour the galaxy for as long as it takes to find her. As he flies off into space, a Blue Lantern ring appears and flies after him, implying that Razer, now filled with hope rather than rage, will become a Blue Lantern. A character design sketch from a proposed new season of episodes shows Razer dressed as a Blue Lantern and saying, "Hello, Aya, it's good to see you again." This appearance was later used in the Young Justice: Phantoms episode "Encounter Upon the Razor’s Edge!", implying that both series are set in the same universe, as following the events of the episode, Razer sets out in the galaxy to find Aya.
 Aya (voiced by Grey DeLisle) – The Interceptors AI, Aya is an AI created by Scar as an empathetic alternative to the Manhunters. Scar created an extremely advanced computer, but was not satisfied with its lack of social intelligence, so infused it with a fragment of an entity inside the Green Lanterns' Central Battery. However, due to this, Aya developed a consciousness with her curiosity and free will, leading Aya to transfer data without Scar's permission. When caught, Aya asked Scar why Scar was not complying with the other guardians. This led to a brief power struggle inside Scar's lab. The power struggle resulted in Aya's memory being wiped by Scar and Aya being installed into the Intercepter as its AI. Able to interface with other machines, Aya's consciousness resurfaces as she begins to consider herself a Green Lantern while developing feelings for Razer. But the episode "Cold Fury", after having her heart broken, Aya shuts down her emotions to destroy the Anti-Monitor by removing his head from his body so she can attach herself to it. Afterwards, wielding the Anti-Monitor body and declaring that her former team cares nothing for her and her kind, the emotionless Aya takes control over the Manhunters before departing to travel back to the Big Bang so that the universe develops without emotional beings. However, as a genuine living being, Aya was never able to completely seal off her emotions and critically wounding Razer when his "unsuccessful" attack during Jordan's own use of the fight-and-talk strategy cured her of the Anti-Monitor body's coercive persuasion. With the Manhunters still a threat, as well as each possessing a copy of her coding, Aya releases a virus to wipe all versions of the Aya program from existence, including herself. Razer begs her not to leave him, but she responds that she will always be with him before disappearing.

Guardians of the Universe 
 Ganthet (voiced by Ian Abercrombie)
 Appa Ali Apsa (voiced by Brian George)
 Sayd (voiced by Susan Blakeslee)
 Scar (voiced by Sarah Douglas)

Green Lantern Corps 
 Mogo (voiced by Kevin Michael Richardson) – A sentient planet that imprisoned criminals on its surface for many years before becoming a Green Lantern.
 Salaak (voiced by Tom Kenny) – A multi-armed Green Lantern senior administrator who appears in the first-season finale, defending the Guardians from the Red Lantern invasion. He is visibly upset when he discovers that the Guardians have been withholding information from the Corps. Salaak appears in the final episode of the series, acting as the battlefield coordinator in the fight against the Manhunters.
 Ch'p – Ch'p appears as a new recruit of the Green Lanterns pitted against Hal Jordan as part of a bet. In a convincing display of skill, the Green Lantern squirrel easily defeats Jordan, winning the bet for his trainer, Kilowog. He later assists Hal in rescuing Aya from the Guardians' labs. Ch'p appears again as a squadron leader during the Battle of Ranx. He also participates in the final battle against the Manhunters in the series finale. Ch'p is not mentioned by name nor does he have any spoken dialogue. He is referred to in the series as "Sector Recruit 1014", which is consistent with the character's sector assignment in the comic books.
 Tomar-Re (voiced by Jeff Bennett) – Tomar-Re is a member of the Green Lantern Honor Guard, who teams with Hal to investigate the Manhunter threat. He later appears at the Battle of Ranx, leading one of the Green Lantern squadrons.
 Guy Gardner (voiced by Diedrich Bader) – Hal's replacement as the Sector Lantern of 2814 after Hal's victory over the Red Lantern Corps and promotion to the Corps Honor Guard. Quickly promoted to Honor Guard duty, Guy is placed in charge of the Corps during the Battle of Ranx, much to Hal's chagrin. He states that after being promoted, he was replaced by John Stewart as the Green Lantern of Earth. Guy also leads the Corps against Aya's Manhunters in the series finale.
 Sinestro (voiced by Ron Perlman) – Considered one of the greatest Green Lanterns (though unconventional in his tactics), he is Hal Jordan's idol and mentor. He has shown to be willing to kill his enemies, in violation of Green Lantern protocols.
 Chaselon (voiced by Tom Kenny) – The crystalline Green Lantern is first seen in the episode "Reboot", where he is assigned to watch over the lab where Aya is being dissected. He is distracted by Hal Jordan while Ch'p recovers Aya's memory core. Later, Chaselon serves in Guy Gardner's squadron at the Battle of Ranx, alongside Larvox, and later fights against the Manhunters in the series finale. Chaselon is characterized as naive and somewhat lonely, admitting to Hal that he has few friends on Oa.
 Iolande (voiced by Tara Strong) – Queen of the planet Betrassus. When Hal and Kilowog arrived on her planet to recruit its resident Green Lantern, Dulock, to fight the Red Lanterns, one of her generals attempted to force her hand in marriage, which Dulock openly challenged. When her brother, Ragnar, murdered Dulock to obtain his ring, it instead passed to Iolande, who resolved to remain her planet's queen and its protector.

Red Lantern Corps 
 Atrocitus (voiced by Jonathan Adams) – The (former) leader of the Red Lantern Corps. Due to his planet's destruction, the power of the Red Ring and ruthless crusade of revenge against the Guardians and the Green Lantern Corps, Atrocitus never found true happiness as he was willing to destroy other worlds no matter the cost.
 Zilius Zox (voiced by Tom Kenny) – A sycophant who is almost never far from Atrocitus's side, constantly offering him praise. After Atrocitus was arrested, Zox became the new leader of the Red Lanterns.
 Bleez (voiced by Grey DeLisle) – The only female Red Lantern depicted, Bleez comes from a winged race and prefers to rely on her own wings to fly while in-atmosphere, rather than her Red Power Ring.
 Veon (voiced by Jason Spisak) – A one-eyed Red Lantern who apparently possesses some measure of psychic ability.
 Skallox (voiced by Kevin Michael Richardson) – A hulking, brutish Red Lantern with an ongoing rivalry against Kilowog, his physical equal.
 Cleric Loran (voiced by Corey Burton) – An eyeless, armored, slug-like alien of an unknown species who is exclusive to the series. Loran does not appear to possess a Power Ring, but maintains a Chapel dedicated to Atrocitus on the Red Lantern's base, the Shard. Loran, along with the Red Lantern Corps, venerates Atrocitus as a prophet and visionary, calling Atrocitus' rage "holy", and quoting passages from the Book of Rage (an object similar to the Book of Parallax, the Book of Oa, and the Book of the Black) like scripture.
 Ragnar (voiced by Will Friedle) – Ragnar is a character that exists in the mainstream of DC Comics, but only becomes a Red Lantern in Green Lantern: The Animated Series. He was responsible for the death of his planet's resident Green Lantern, Duloc, in hopes that his ring would choose him. After failing to become a Green Lantern and seeing his sister (Queen Iolande) chosen in his place, his great rage at failing to gain the power of a green ring brings him to the Red Lanterns.

Blue Lantern Corps 
 Saint Walker (voiced by Phil Morris) – The first Blue Lantern in the universe.
 Brother Warth (voiced by Brian George) – The second Blue Lantern whose appearance is that of an elephant.

Star Sapphires 
 Carol Ferris (voiced by Jennifer Hale) – Hal Jordan's love interest and Vice President at Ferris Aircraft. In "...In Love and War", she learns Hal Jordan is a Green Lantern. In "New Guy", she breaks up with Hal after she realizes that his duties to the Green Lantern Corp complicated their relationship. In "Love Is a Battlefield" Carol is brought back to Zamaron to be the champion of Love and fight Atrocitus who is the champion of Hate. Her battle with Atrocitus is tough and she realizes that she can use her power ring to call her loved one to aid her. Hal comes through the star portal to help Carol and together they defeat Atrocitus. At the end of the episode, Carol decided to keep her ring to honor Gi'ata and also renews her relationship with Hal.
 Queen Aga'po (voiced by Grey DeLisle) – The queen of Zamaron and leader of the Star Sapphires. She and her Corps use the power of Love to help couples to be together.
 Gi'ata (voiced by Jennifer Hale) – The niece of Queen Aga'po. She thought love was just a way to help people become happy by bringing loved ones together. However, she later learns the true meaning of love and teaches it to her people. In "Love is a Battlefield", she is killed defending Hal from Atrocitus. Aga'po tells Hal, Carol, Razer, and Kilowog that her niece did not die in vain, but to protect the true meaning of love and will be honored as the greatest Star Sapphire of Zamaron, with Carol saying they will remember Gi'ata in their hearts as a true hero.
 Galia: (voiced by Vanessa Marshall) – Kilowog met her on her home planet. She reminds him of his wife seeing how their species look alike. In "Fear Itself", Kilowog helps her people fight their enemies who turns out not to be hostile but to help get rid of the yellow crystals that are poisonous. In "...In Love and War", Galia was brought to Zamaron by Queen Aga'po to become a Star Sapphire as a way to capture Kilowog, however, in "Homecoming" and "Love Is a Battlefield" she is not seen among the Corps suggesting that she may have been released from her duties to the Star Sapphires.

Orange Lantern Corps 
 Larfleeze (voiced by Dee Bradley Baker) – The sole member of the Orange Lantern Corps and a greedy criminal, hence his powers.
 Glomulus – A construct of the Orange Light.

Machines 
 Anti-Monitor (voiced by Tom Kenny) – An enormous robot created by a renegade Guardian, the Anti-Monitor has an insatiable hunger and feeds on literally everything. After going rogue upon creation, his creator banished it to an alternate dimension, but this only caused that dimension to be fed on. Eventually the Anti-Monitor returned to his own dimension, resurrected the Manhunters, and began wreaking havoc, thus becoming the second season's main antagonist for the first half. However, in "Cold Fury", the Anti-Monitor's head was separated from his body by Aya as she took it for her use. Eventually, she finished the job to obtain an item needed for her agenda.
 Manhunters (voiced by Josh Keaton) – Emotionless robots created by the Guardians to serve as soldiers of the Green Lantern Corps. However, they were given imperfect programming which caused them to determine that since crime is caused by emotional responses, all beings with emotions must be evil.  They wiped out an entire sector before the Guardians stopped them, and the Red Lantern Corps was formed to avenge this genocide. The Manhunters were revived by the Anti-Monitor in the second half of the season. After Aya destroys the Anti-Monitor, she names herself the queen of the Manhunters and copied her data into them.
 LANOS (voiced by Brian George) – Lanos is an artificial intelligence that replaced Aya on the Intercepter after she was removed for dissection. Returns for two episodes after Aya becomes the Aya Monitor and sacrifices himself to save the crew.  Known for an annoyingly cheerful personality and his tendency to "fly like a madman" while neglecting the use of inertial dampeners.  He sacrificed himself to save the others from Aya by ramming the Intercepter into her and sending them both through hyperspace. Kilowog nicknamed LANOS "LAME-O".

Development 
In early stages of production, the show was conceived as a "Bruce Timm-does-CG-project". Phil Kent, chairman and CEO of Time Warner's Turner Networks unit, originally announced that Green Lantern: The Animated Series would be a part of Cartoon Network's original programming. A preview of the show was featured at the 2010 New York Comic Con featuring test footage, characters/story description, and art work. Bruce Timm, who produced the entire DC Animated Universe, also announced at New York Comic Con that he would be producing the show. Timm was originally reluctant to use CG instead of traditional animation, but eventually came around. A total of 26 episodes had been ordered for the first season. By the time of New York Comic Con, thirteen had already been planned, and five had already been recorded. The series is not intended to be an origin story, due to Warner Bros. already releasing a film based on the characters' origin. The series is the first television series by Bruce Timm and the first series featuring Green Lantern to be rendered using CG. The producers have confirmed that it was requested that the character Sinestro not be used. This was later overturned in 2013, and Sinestro finally did appear. The producers also confirmed that if the series was a hit, other Lanterns like Guy Gardner, John Stewart and Kyle Rayner might be introduced.

Cast

Main cast 
 Josh Keaton – Hal Jordan/Green Lantern, Manhunters
 Grey DeLisle – Aya, Queen Aga'Po, Lady Catherine, Amala Rev, Biara Rev, Bleez
 Kevin Michael Richardson – Kilowog, Red Lantern Rings, Dulock, Mogo, Skallox
 Jason Spisak – Razer, Veon

Additional voices 
 Jonathan Adams – Atrocitus
 Ian Abercrombie– Ganthet
 Diedrich Bader – Guy Gardner
 Dee Bradley Baker – Larfleeze
 Jeff Bennett – Tomar-Re, Duke Nigel Thorntonberry
 Susanne Blakeslee – Sayd
 Clancy Brown – General Zartok
 Corey Burton – Cleric Loran, Leph
 John DiMaggio – Kothak
 Sarah Douglas – Science Director Scar
 Robin Atkin Downes – Steam Lantern
 Robert Englund – Myglom
 Will Friedle – Ragnar 
 Brian George – Appa Ali Apsa, M'Ten, LANOS, Brother Warth
 Jennifer Hale – Carol Ferris/Star Sapphire, Ghi'ata
 Tom Kenny – Zilius Zox, Salaak, Byth Rok, Anti-Monitor, Bumpy, Chaselon
 Wayne Knight – Captain Goray
 Juliet Landau – Drusa
 Vanessa Marshall – Galia
 Phil Morris – Saint Walker
 Rob Paulsen – Goggan
 Ron Perlman – Sinestro
 Kurtwood Smith – Shyir Rev
 Tara Strong – Queen Iolande

Episodes

Reception

Critical reception 
Green Lantern, since its first showing at the 2011 Comic Con, has received positive reviews. Chris Sims of ComicsAlliance commented that he'd never been a huge fan of Green Lantern, but rather of DC Animated Universe creator Bruce Timm, and when he heard that Timm was producing the series he began looking forward to it, saying that the one-hour premiere "does it right." Tony Guerrero of Comic Vine said it was "a good first episode and definitely worth checking out." Brian Lowry of Variety praised the animation style, saying that "Warner Bros. has gone full bore into the CGI dimension with a bold, sleek design that more than anything resembles The Incredibles."

Awards and nominations

Home media
The series was released on DVD in two volumes by Warner Bros. Home Entertainment. The first volume was released on August 28, 2012 and the second volume was released on June 25, 2013. The entire series was released in a Blu-ray set on March 14, 2014, from Warner Archive.

Other media

Comic books
A series of 15 numbered issues was published between 2011 and 2013. Its 32-paged debut comic, Green Lantern: The Animated Series #0 was released on November 30, 2011, written by Art Baltazar with art by Dario Brizuela. The first issue received mixed to positive reviews, with one reviewer giving a B+ stating it is "good kids material" and "a fun way to introduce new readers, especially younger readers, to the Green Lantern universe without having to worry about the violence level." The issue gathered a high sales debut, with an approximate 13,500 copies sold. A story from one of the issues was included in the DC Nation 2012 Free Comic Day comic.

Compilations
Green Lantern: The Animated Series (2013-01-09): Includes #0-5.
Green Lantern: The Animated Volume 2 (2014-01-08): Includes #6-11.

Stone Arch Books
Green Lantern The Animated Series True Colors
Green Lantern The Animated Series Counterfeits
Green Lantern The Animated Series The Invisible Destroyer
Green Lantern The Animated Series Bounty Hunter (/EAN-5 90000)
Green Lantern The Animated Series Tattooed Man Trouble!
Green Lantern The Animated Series Trouble in the Arena! (/EAN-5 90000)
Green Lantern The Animated Series Hal Versus Atrocitus
Green Lantern The Animated Series Goldface Attacks!

Other series
 The Justice League Action episode "Barehanded" introduced a variation of Aya, voiced again by Grey Griffin. This version is Space Cabbie's navigational computer.
 Razer appears in the Young Justice episode "Encounter Upon the Razor’s Edge!", in which he is shown to be continuing his search for Aya and becomes a hybrid Red/Blue Lantern.

Licensed merchandise
DC Direct released two limited edition maquettes, to accompany the official release of Green Lantern: The Animated Series in spring 2012. Mattel had plans to manufacture action figures based on the series in 2011, but none were produced.

Video games
A horizontal shooter starring Hal Jordan was released in 2015 at Cartoon Network site.

Soundtrack 
La-La Land Records, the record label behind the Batman: The Animated Series soundtracks, released the show's soundtrack on July 31, 2012. The label would later release a second volume of music from the series on July 2, 2013.

References

External links 

 DC page: TV, comics
 
 
 

American computer-animated television series
2010s American animated television series
2010s American science fiction television series
2012 American television series debuts
2013 American television series endings
Cartoon Network original programming
English-language television shows
American children's animated action television series
American children's animated space adventure television series
American children's animated drama television series
American children's animated science fantasy television series
American children's animated superhero television series
Green Lantern in other media
Animated television shows based on DC Comics
Television series by Warner Bros. Animation
Television series set on fictional planets
DC Nation